2006–07 Bosnia and Herzegovina Football Cup was the thirteenth season of the Bosnia and Herzegovina's annual football cup, and a seventh season of the unified competition. The competition started on 20 September 2006 with the First Round and concluded on 26 May 2007 with the Final.

First round
Thirty-two teams entered in the First Round. The matches were played on 20 and 21 September 2006.

|}

Second round
The 16 winners from the prior round enter this round. The first legs were played on 17 and 18 October and the second legs were played on 25 October 2006.
 

|}

Quarterfinals
The eight winners from the prior round enter this round. The first legs were played on 8 and 15 November and the second legs were played on 22 November 2006.

|}

Semifinals
The four winners from the prior round enter this round. The first legs will be played on 11 April and the second legs were played on 25 April 2007.

|}

Final

First leg

Second leg

Široki Brijeg won 2–1 on aggregate.

Notes

See also
 2006–07 Premier League of Bosnia and Herzegovina

External links
Statistics on RSSSF

Bosnia and Herzegovina Football Cup seasons
Cup
Bosnia